The anime series Fafner in the Azure has 26 episodes. The opening theme is "Shangri-La", the insert theme in episode 15 is "Proof" and the ending theme is "Separation".

A two-part OVA subtitled Arcadian Memory, summarizing the series in its entirety, was released on November 2, 2005 and January 12, 2006.

A prequel television special subtitled RIGHT OF LEFT aired on December 30, 2005. The theme song is "Peace of mind" and the insert song is "Hatenaki Monologue" (果て無きモノローグ, lit. "Unending Monologue").

A sequel theatrical film subtitled HEAVEN AND EARTH premiered on December 25, 2010. It is set two years after the end of the original TV series. The theme song is "Soukyuu" (蒼穹, lit. "Azure") and the insert song is "Sayonara no Toki Kurai Hohoende" (さよならの時くらい微笑んで, lit. "Smile at the Time of Goodbye").

A sequel TV series subtitled EXODUS has 26 episodes, the first half aired between January and April 2015 and the second half airs between October and December 2015. It takes place two and a half years after the events in Heaven and Earth. The first opening theme is "EXIST" and the first ending theme is "An'ya Kōro" (暗夜航路, lit. "Dark Night Route"). Both songs are replaced in episode 18 with "DEAD OR ALIVE" as the new opening and "Horizon" as the new ending. The insert song in episode 9 is "Sono toki, Soukyuu e" (その時、蒼穹へ, lit. "At that Time, to the Azure"), the special ending theme in episode 17 is "Aisuru koto" (愛すること, lit. "To Love").

All opening, insert and ending theme songs are written and performed by Japanese band angela.

Episode List

Fafner in the Azure (2004) 

For the DVD version, the special final 25th episode was split into two parts:

Fafner in the Azure: Arcadian Memory (2005)

Fafner in the Azure: Right of Left (2005)

Fafner in the Azure: Heaven and Earth (2010)

Fafner in the Azure: Exodus (2015)

References 

Lists of anime episodes